The 2007 Skate America was the first event of six in the 2007–08 ISU Grand Prix of Figure Skating, a senior-level international invitational competition series. It was held at the Sovereign Center in Reading, Pennsylvania on October 25–28. Medals were awarded in the disciplines of men's singles, ladies' singles, pair skating, and ice dancing. Skaters earned points toward qualifying for the 2007–08 Grand Prix Final. The compulsory dance was the Austrian Waltz.

Schedule
 Friday, Oct. 26
 6:00 p.m. - Compulsory dance
 7:35 p.m. - Pairs' short program
 9:10 p.m. - Men's short program
 Saturday, Oct. 27
 2:00 p.m. - Original dance
 3:45 p.m. - Pairs' free skating
 6:00 p.m. - Ladies' short program
 7:55 p.m. - Men's free skating
 Sunday, Oct. 28
 2:00 p.m. - Free dance
 4:08 p.m. - Ladies' free skating
 7:30 p.m. - Exhibition of Champions

Results

Men

Referee: Beth Crane

Technical Controller: Igor Prokop

Technical Specialist: Vladimir Petrenko

Assistant Technical Specialist: David Santee

Judge No.1: Karen Butcher 

Judge No.2: Raffaella Locatelli 

Judge No.3: Anne G. Shean 

Judge No.4: Igor Obraztsov 

Judge No.5: Kerstin Kimminus 

Judge No.6: Salome Chigogidze 

Judge No.7: Leena Kurri 

Judge No.8: Mona Jonsson 

Judge No.9: Masako Kubota 

Judge No.10: Valerie Greugny 

Data Operator: Marylin Kreuzinger

Replay Operator: David Kirby

Ladies

Referee: Hely Abbondati

Technical Controller: Steve Winkler

Technical Specialist: Jayson Peace

Assistant Technical Specialist: Vladimir Petrenko

Judge No.1: Karen Howard 

Judge No.2: Elena Buriak 

Judge No.3: Salome Chigogidze 

Judge No.4: Wei Shi 

Judge No.5: Mayumi Kato 

Judge No.6: Mona Jonsson 

Judge No.7: Raffaella Locatelli 

Judge No.8: William S. Smith 

Judge No.9: Karen Jones 

Judge No.10: Leena Kurri 

Data Operator: Marylin Kreuzinger

Replay Operator: David Santee

Pairs

Ice dancing

External links

 Official site
 Starting Orders and Results
 2007 Skate America at ISU
 2007 Skate America at U.S. Figure Skating
  

Skate America, 2007
Skate America
Sports competitions in Pennsylvania